S-23 is an investigational selective androgen receptor modulator (SARM) developed by GTX, Inc as a potential male hormonal contraceptive. It binds to the androgen receptor more strongly than older drugs such as andarine with a Ki of 1.7 nM, and in animal studies it showed both a good ratio of anabolic to androgenic effects, and dose-dependent suppression of spermatogenesis with spontaneous recovery after cessation of treatment.

References 

Anilides
Tertiary alcohols
Chloroarenes
Fluoroarenes
Nitriles
Phenol ethers
Selective androgen receptor modulators
Trifluoromethyl compounds